The 2013–14 Barangay Ginebra San Miguel season was the 34th season of the franchise in the Philippine Basketball Association (PBA).

Key dates
November 3: The 2013 PBA Draft took place in Midtown Atrium, Robinson Place Manila.
April 29: Jeffrey Cariaso was designated as head coach. Olsen Racela was also transferred from San Mig Coffee to Ginebra to be the team's lead assistant coach. Ato Agustin was demoted to assistant coach.

Draft picks

Roster

 

 

  Chua also serves as Barangay Ginebra's alternate governor.

Philippine Cup

Eliminations

Standings

Playoffs

Bracket

Commissioner's Cup

Eliminations

Standings

Playoffs

Bracket

Governors' Cup

Eliminations

Standings

Bracket

Transactions

Trades

Pre-season

Recruited imports

References

Barangay Ginebra San Miguel seasons
Barangay Ginebra